Thomas Newnham Bayley Spencer (born 10 April 1948) is a British Conservative Party politician and former Member of the European Parliament (MEP).

Spencer was educated at Pangbourne Nautical College and the University of Southampton.

He served as Conservative MEP for Derbyshire from 1979 to 1984, Conservative MEP for Surrey West from 1989 to 1994, and as Conservative MEP for Surrey from 1994 to 1999. He was leader of the UK Conservative MEPs from 1995 to 1998 and was Chairman of the Parliament's Foreign Affairs Committee from 1997 to 1999.

He decided not to stand for re-election to the European Parliament in 1999 after being found with gay pornography and two cannabis cigarettes in his luggage at Heathrow Airport. Spencer acknowledged being gay and said that his wife was aware of that before they married. Spencer was in a relationship with pornographic actor Cole Tucker, who was depicted in the pornography found in Spencer's luggage.

References

1948 births
Living people
Alumni of the University of Southampton
Gay politicians
LGBT MEPs for the United Kingdom
English LGBT politicians
Conservative Party (UK) MEPs
MEPs for England 1979–1984
MEPs for England 1989–1994
MEPs for England 1994–1999
People educated at Pangbourne College